Claud Stephen Phillimore, 4th Baron Phillimore (15 January 1911 – 29 March 1994) was an English architect specialising in larger country houses who succeeded to his family's title in 1990.

He was educated at Trinity College, Cambridge, where he was a member of the Pitt Club.

He was married to Anne Elizabeth Dorrien-Smith (b.1911), daughter of Major Arthur Dorrien-Smith. Their son Francis Stephen Phillimore (b. 1944) succeeded as 5th Baron Phillimore.

Architectural Works

These include:

Knowsley Hall, Prescot, Merseyside, (1953–54), reduction and reconstruction of the hall; construction of the New House in the grounds.
11 Binney Street, Mayfair, London (1957), interior remodelled with Aubrey Jenkins for Viscount Ridley.
The Dower House in the grounds of Arundel Castle, Sussex, (1959).
The Durdans, Epsom, Surrey (1950s), reduction and reconstruction.
Killruddery House, Bray, County Wicklow, Republic of Ireland (1950s), reduction and reconstruction.
Rademon House, Crossgar, County Down - 1950s, rebuilt after a fire.
Aske Hall, North Yorkshire, (1963-4), demolition of ballroom and reduction of wings.
Tusmore House, Oxfordshire, (1964), demolished.
Villa Foscari near Venice, Italy: renovation work; Phillimore inherited the house in 1965 from Alberto Clinton Landsberg, but sold it to architect Prof. Antonio ("Tonci"), Count Foscari (b. 1938), in 1973. 
23 St Anselm's Place, Mayfair, London, (1966–67) as a private residence for the fourth Duke of Westminster.
Cubberley, a house in the Wye Valley, Herefordshire (1971), replacing an earlier house.

Arms

References

1911 births
1994 deaths
20th-century English architects
Barons in the Peerage of the United Kingdom
Alumni of Trinity College, Cambridge
City of London Yeomanry (Rough Riders) officers